Loja may refer to:

Places
 Loja, Granada, Spain
 Loja, Ecuador
 Loja, Estonia
 Loja, Latvia
 Loja Canton, Ecuador
 Loja Province, Ecuador

Other
 Loja (architecture), a type of store in Cape Verde
 Loja (crater), a Martian crater
 Loja (katydid), a genus of bush cricket in the tribe Agraeciini
 Loja Airport, Ecuador
 Loja, a novel by Albanian writer Teodor Keko
 Loja CD, a football team from the Spanish town
 LDU Loja, a football team from the Ecuadorian city 
 Mário Loja (born 1977), Portuguese football player

See also
 Nueva Loja, a city in Ecuador
 Loxa, a genus of insects
 Loxa bark, another name for cinchona